Aurélio de Lira Tavares (7 November 1905 – 18 November 1998) was a general in the Brazilian Army. He was one of the military in the joint military board that ruled Brazil between the illness of Artur da Costa e Silva in August 1969 and the investiture ceremony of Emílio Garrastazu Médici in October of that same year.

During the government of the junta, the American ambassador to Brazil Charles Burke Elbrick was kidnapped by the communist guerilla group Revolutionary Movement 8th October — radical opposition to the military dictatorship.

Tavares was born in João Pessoa.

See also
 List of presidents of Brazil
 Brazilian military government
 Augusto Rademaker
 Márcio Melo

1905 births
1998 deaths
People from Paraíba
Brazilian generals
Military dictatorship in Brazil
Ambassadors of Brazil to France
Commanders Crosses of the Order of Merit of the Federal Republic of Germany